Al Siyassa Al Musawwara (: Politics Illustrated) also known as as-Siyasa al-Musawwara, was a multilingual magazine. The magazine was also referred to as the Cairo Punch. It was started in 1907 in Cairo, Egypt, but when the publisher Abdul Hamit Zaki forced to exile it was published in Bologna, Italy, until 1923.

History and profile
Al Siyassa Al Musawwara was launched on 15 December 1907 and edited and published by Abdul Hamit Zaki who would leave Egypt for Italy. On the masthead of the magazine there was another title in addition to Arabic title, namely Cairo Punch. 

The magazine featured colour political caricatures and satire and had a nationalist political stance. Its content was published in three languages, Arabic, English and French, and it covered political affairs in Egypt and in other countries, including the British occupation and European imperialism. Textual materials were written by Hafiz Ibrahim. The magazine frequently mocked the publishers of the pro-British newspaper, Al Muqattam, who were Syrian-origin Christians, namely Faris Nimr, Yaqub Sarruf and Shahin Makaryus.

Following the exile of Abdul Hamit Zaki Al Siyassa Al Musawwara was published until 1923 in Bologna.

The first thirty-seven issues of Al Siyassa Al Musawwara are archived in the Hoover Institution Library of Stanford University.

References

1907 establishments in Egypt
1923 disestablishments in Italy
Arabic-language magazines
Defunct political magazines published in Italy
Defunct political magazines published in Egypt
Egyptian political satire
English-language magazines
French-language magazines
Magazines about comics
Magazines established in 1907
Magazines disestablished in 1923
Magazines published in Cairo
Mass media in Bologna
Satirical magazines published in Italy
Multilingual magazines